Alfredo Foglino (1893–1968) was a Uruguayan football player and manager.

Playing career

Club career
Foglino made his debut for Nacional in 1911. In 14 years for Foglino played 409 matches including nine Primera División Uruguaya championships. He was captain of Nacional for ten years.

International career
Foglino played 47 times for Uruguay, making his debut for the national team in August 1912 and playing his last international in July 1923.

He played in three continental championships for Uruguay; in 1916, 1917 and 1920.

Management career

Uruguay
Foglino was appointed player manager of the Uruguay national team for several matches in 1915 and 1916. As a 23-year-old he was at the helm of the Uruguay team that won the 1916 South American Championship.

Honours

Club 

 Nacional
Primera División Uruguaya:1912, 1915, 1916, 1917, 1919, 1920, 1922, 1923 & 1924

Country 
 Uruguay
South American Championship (Copa América): 1916, 1917 & 1920

Manager 
 Uruguay
South American Championship (Copa América): 1916

References

Footballers from Montevideo
Uruguayan football managers
Uruguayan footballers
Uruguayan Primera División players
Club Nacional de Football players
Uruguay international footballers
1968 deaths
1893 births
Uruguay national football team managers
Copa América-winning players
Association football defenders